Zimbabweite is a mineral; formula .  It is generally classed as an arsenite but is notable for also containing niobium  and tantalum.  A yellow brown mineral with orthorhombic crystal habit and a hardness of 5. It was discovered in 1986 in kaolinized pegmatite, i.e. weathered to clay, in Zimbabwe.

References

Sodium minerals
Potassium minerals
Lead minerals
Arsenic minerals
Niobium minerals
Tantalum minerals
Titanium minerals
Oxide minerals
Orthorhombic minerals
Minerals described in 1986